Scaredy Camp is an American television series that aired on Nickelodeon. It was hosted by Emma Wilson (the daughter of Weakest Link host, Anne Robinson).

The show featured children competing against each other to find clues about urban legends that surround the summer camp that they are attending. Ten episodes were filmed in all, with repeats shown on Nick GAS until the channel became automated in 2005, eventually shutting down 2 years later.

The show's first season was filmed at Camp Lindenmere in Henryville, Pennsylvania, during the summer of 2002. The camp, however, was referred to as "Camp Lindenwood" on the show, due to legal reasons. The show was created by Liz Sommers (née Becker).

References

External links
 

American children's reality television series
2000s American children's game shows
2000s American reality television series
2000s Nickelodeon original programming
2002 American television series debuts
2003 American television series endings
English-language television shows
Television series about children
Television shows filmed in Pennsylvania